Pader Airfield (also Patongo Airfield)  is an airfield serving  Pader and Patongo, two towns,  apart, in the south-eastern part of Pader District, in the Northern Region of Uganda.

Location

Overview
The airfield was developed in 2006, by Medair, a non-profit based in Geneva, Switzerland, to serve the people of Patongo and surrounding communities. Medair received financial and other support from the European Union to complete this infrastructure development. The airfield cost USh250 million to build in 2006 (approx. US$100,000 in 2006 money). At the time of commissioning, Medair deeded the maintenance and management of the airstrip to local authorities.

Pader airfield was built to facilitate safe travel for aid workers who were working with the estimated 40,000 people who were confined to the Patongo IDP Camp, at the height of the LRA insurgency in the early and mid 2000s.

See also

List of airports in Uganda
Transport in Uganda

References

External links
Uganda eyes May 2019 to get funds for domestic flights infrastructure

Airports in Uganda
Pader District
Acholi sub-region
Airports established in 2006
2006 establishments in Uganda
Northern Region, Uganda